The Twenty-eighth Legislature of Albania (Albanian: Legjislatura e njëzet e tetë), officially known as the VII Pluralist Legislature of Albania (Albanian: Legjislatura e VII Pluraliste e Shqipërisë), was the legislature of Albania following the 2009 Albanian Parliamentary election of Members of Parliament (MPs) to the Albanian Parliament. The party of the Prime Minister Sali Berisha, PD, obtained majority of 74 deputies.

28th Legislature 

The two largest political parties in Albania are the Democratic Party (PD) and the Socialist Party (PS). Following is a list of political parties and alliances with representation in the Parliament by the June 2009 elections:

MPS

Sources 

Legislatures of Albania